Deshalpur railway station is a small railway station in Kutch district, Gujarat, in India. Its code is DSLP. The station consists of 1 platform. It serves Deshalpur village and is located in the vicinity of Desalpar Gunthli, an archaeological site belonging to the Indus Valley Civilisation.

The station had a metre-gauge railway line laid in 1980 to get connected with the town of Bhuj. The line was abandoned later since Gandhidham–Bhuj section got converted to broad gauge and this 101.24 km line became isolated. Recently gauge conversion to broad gauge has been approved by the Government of India in June 2016, so that it can be used for public, military or freight purpose.
In 2018 the railway section between Bhuj and Deshalpur village (28 km) was commissioned, remaining under gauge conversion Deshalpur–Naliya section (74 km).  there aren't any train services from and to this station.

Bhuj–Naliya railway line is classified as being of strategic importance, due to its proximity to the border with Pakistan and Naliya Air Force Station.

There is a project to extend the line up to Vayor village, 25 km northwest of Naliya.

References

Railway stations in Kutch district
Ahmedabad railway division